Gadecki or Gądecki is a Polish surname. Notable people with the surname include:

 Olivia Gadecki (born 2002), Australian tennis player
 Sabina Gadecki (born 1983), American actress and model
 Stanisław Gądecki (born 1949), Polish bishop
 Zygmunt Gadecki (1938–2000), Polish footballer

See also
 

Polish-language surnames